Llansannan Football Club is a Welsh football team based in Llansannan, Conwy County Borough, Wales.  The team currently play in the North Wales Coast East Football League Premier Division, which is at the fourth tier of the Welsh football league system.

History
The team played in the Vale of Clwyd and Conwy Football League before in 2020 the team was accepted into the Premier Division of the new North Wales Coast East Football League.

Honours

Vale of Clwyd and Conwy Football League Premier Division - Runners-up: 2013–14
Vale of Clwyd and Conwy Football League Premier Cup – Winners: 2017–18
Vale of Clwyd and Conwy Football League Premier Cup – Runners-up: 2016–17
Vale of Conwy Football League – Champions: 1996–97
North Wales Coast FA Intermediate Cup – Winners: 2012–13

External links
Club official Twitter
Club official Facebook

References

Football clubs in Wales
Sport in Conwy County Borough
Vale of Clwyd and Conwy Football League clubs
North Wales Coast Football League clubs
Vale of Conwy Football League clubs